Thondi or Tondi is a Panchayat town in Ramanathapuram district in the Indian state of Tamil Nadu. It is located 48Km North from district headquarters Ramanathapuram. It is  believed to be an ancient port site of Pandiyan kingdom. The famous Sri Sarvatheertheswarar Temple at Marungur, Theerthandathanam is located little northerly to Thondi.

Religion wise population

As per the Census 2011, majority of the population follows 
Religion[4]	Total	
Hindu	10,049	
Muslim	8,542			
Christian	836

Overview 
Thondi is a Town Panchayat city in district of Ramanathapuram, Tamil Nadu. The Thondi city is divided into 15 wards for which elections are held every 5 years. The Thondi Town Panchayat has population of 18,465 of which 9,316 are males while 9,149 are females as per report released by Census India 2011.

Population of Children with age of 0-6 is 2246 which is 12.16% of total population of Thondi (TP). In Thondi Town Panchayat, Female Sex Ratio is of 982 against state average of 996. Moreover, Child Sex Ratio in Thondi is around 907 compared to Tamil Nadu state average of 943. Literacy rate of Thondi city is 89.61% higher than state average of 80.09%. In Thondi, Male literacy is around 93.87% while female literacy rate is 85.32%.

Thondi Town Panchayat has total administration over 3,859 houses to which it supplies basic amenities like water and sewerage. It is also authorize to build roads within Thondi Town Panchayat limits and impose taxes on properties coming under its jurisdiction. Currently our website doesn't have information on schools and hospital located within Thondi.

Climate

References

Cities and towns in Ramanathapuram district